The Aerial tramway, also known as Aerial lift or Aerial ropeway and cable car popularly known as ropeway in India, is a public transportation system where cabins, gondolas or open chairs are hauled above the ground with the help of cables. They are usually built in mountainous areas where it is difficult to build roads or railway.

List

By states of India.

Andhra Pradesh

Ropeways in Andhra Pradesh are:

 Srisailam ropeway: It was constructed in year 2005. It is 700 m long, mono-cable PFG ropeway.

 Visakhapatnam ropeway: It is a 800 PPH (person per hour) capacity, 350 m long ropeway at Kailasagiri.

Arunachal Pradesh

Ropeways in Arunachal Pradesh are:

 Tawang Monastery ropeway: Built in 2010 at 11000 feet above sea level, it is one of the highest in the world.

Assam

Ropeways in Assam are:

 Guwahati Umananda Island ropeway: Twin-track, bi-cable, double reversible jigback ropeway of 1800m length and 250 PPH capacity is India's longest river ropeway. It is built across Brahmaputra river over Umanand Island and allows easy transportation to and from North Guwahati.

Gujarat

Ropeways in Gujarat are:

 Ambaji ropeway, Ambaji, Gujarat - Installed by Project M/s S.N Lall , MEC ( Aarconinfra Ropeways ) for client Usha Breco Limited, known as Ambaji Udan Kahtola. Ropeways also known as 4th busiest ropeway of India. This ropeway is at Maa Ambaji Devi Temple since 1998. This ropeway has 760PPH capacity.

 Girnar ropeway at Girnar in Junagadh: Started in 2020, was Asia's longest ropeway at the time of its construction.

 Saputara ropeway

 Pavagadh ropeway to Kalika Mata Temple: It was built in 1986. After it was upgraded in 2005 to 1320 PPH capacity with modern technology, it became highest capacity in India. It is third busiest ropeway of India.

Haryana

Ropeways in Haryana are:

 Adi Badri ropeway, planned.
 Agroha Dham, planned.

 Dhosi Hill ropeway, planned.

 Faridabad ropeway, planned, from Surajkund to various lakes in wildlife reserve.
 Ferozepur Jhirka Shiva Temple ropeway, planned.

 Gurugram ropeway, planned.
 Kurukshetra-Jyotisar ropeway, planned.

 Madhogarh Fort ropeway, planned.
 Morni Hills ropeway, planned.

 Panchkula Sukhna Lake-Mansa Devi Temple- Karoh peak ropeway, planned.
 Tosham Hills ropeway, planned.

Himachal Pradesh

Ropeways in Himachal Pradesh are:

 Bilaspur ropeway: It is one of the 7 ropeway projects, of 60.6km combined length, approved for construction in Himachal Pradesh in September 2022 at the total combined cost of nearly INR2964 crore (~US$355 million).

 Chamba ropeway: It is one of the 7 ropeway projects in Himachal approved for construction in September 2022.

 Dharamshala ropeway: It is one of the 7 ropeway projects in Himachal approved for construction in September 2022.

 Kangra ropeway: It is one of the 7 ropeway projects in Himachal approved for construction in September 2022.

 Kullu ropeway: It is one of the 7 ropeway projects in Himachal approved for construction in September 2022.

 Devi ropeway: It was built in 1997 with 800 PPH capacity.  

 Parwanoo Timber Trail ropeway: It is India's first Hill to Hill ropeway which is 1.8 km long without pillars in between the LTP (Lower Terminal point) and UTP (Upper Terminal Point). This bi-cable ropeway, with capacity of 1000 PPH, was built in 1988 for the Timber Trail Resort.

 Shimla Jakhu Temple ropeway: This is 410 m long , double-grip, mono cable ropeway, with 400 PPH capacity was built in 2017.

 Shimla Tara Devi Temple ropeway: It was approved for construction in September 2022. This 14.67km long ropeway with 15 stations will cost INR1546 crore (~US$200 million).

 Sirmaur ropeway: It is one of the 7 ropeway projects in Himachal approved for construction in September 2022.

Jammu and Kashmir

Ropeways in Jammu and Kashmir are:

 Gulmarg Gondola at Gulmarg: This ski resort has the 2nd highest cable car in the world and Asia's highest and longest cable car reaching an altitude of 13,400 ft. 

 Jammu ropeway: it is 1.65 km long cable car, with first section from Peer Kho to the Mahamaya temple over the Tawi River and  second section is from the Mahamaya temple to the Bahu Fort.

 Srinagar cable car: Leads to the Sufi Shrine of Makhdoom Sahib on Hari Parbat.

 Vaishno Devi ropeway: It is a 375 m long, bi-cable, double reversible jigback ropeway with 800 PPH capacity to carry passengers from The Bhavan to Bhairon temple.

Jharkhand

Ropeways in Jharkhand are:

 Deogarh Trikut ropeway: Trikut is cluster of three peaks of the Trikut Hill which signify the holy trinity 8n Hinduism of Brahma, Vishnu and Mahesh. It has 500 PPH capacity that takes passengers to the top of the hill offering a great view of the holy town of Deogarh.

Madhya Pradesh

Ropeways in Madhya Pradesh are:

 Bhopal ropeway: 400 PPH capacity, 600 m long ropeway.

 Bheraghat ropeway at Marble Rocks in Jabalpur is under construction. 

 Chitrakoot ropeway: 302 m long ropeway with 500 PPH capacity. This Aerial Ropeway is situated at Hanuman Dhara in Chitrakoot in Madhya Pradesh.

 Dewas ropeway: 400 PPH capacity 367 m long ropeway ascends from the junction of two national highways right up to Maa Chamunda Temple and Tulja Bhawani Mata Temple, while simultaneously being home to a Jain Temple and a Mosque.

 Maihar Maa Sharda Devi ropeway: It was built in 2009 with 800 PPH capacity.

Odisha

Ropeways in Odisha are:

 Hirakud ropeway: 412m long ropeway with 400 PPH capacity at the Hirakud dam and reservoir on Mahanadi River. 

 Taratarini Temple ropeway: It was constructed in 2013 with 300 PPH capacity.

Rajasthan

Ropeways in Rajasthan are:

 Jodhpur Sidhnath ropeway: Started construction in 2020.

 Pushkar ropeway at Savitri Mata Temple: Takes 6 minutes to cover a distance of 720 mtrs.

Sikkim

Ropeways in Sikkim are:

 Gangtok ropeway: Built in 2003, this ropeway ferries tourists from one part of the city to another and offers a panoramic view of the full Gangtok city. This ropeway also serves to de-congest the city.

 Namchi ropeway: It is a 2.75 km long cable car.

Uttrakhand

Ropeways in Uttrakhand are:

 Auli (Joshimath) ropeway: This is 4.2 km ropeway constructed in 1987 and considered as India's longest and second longest ropeway in Asia at the time of its construction. 

 Haridwar Chandi Devi Temple Udan Khatola ropeway: was Maa Chandi Devi Temple constructed in 1997 800 PPH capacity.

 Haridwar Mansa Devi Temple Udan Kahtola: Haridwar is India's first city with two passenger ropeways. This ropeway, built in 1981 with 800 PPH capacity, is the busiest ropeway of India. 

 Mussoorie ropeway: It is India's first ropeway which was constructed in 1971. It is 400m long, bi-able zig back with 400 PPH capacity.

 Nainital ropeway: Constructed in 1990 in with Swiss technology, it is 2270m long bi-cable, zig-back, 1200 PPH capacity ropeway with 2 wagons which can carry 8 persons each.

West Bengal

Ropeways in West Bengal are:

 Darjeeling ropeway: 2000 PPD capacity, 2.3 km long, detachable-grip type, six-seater, multi-cabin, gondola type ropeway.

 Digha cable car: It was built in 2015 is within the premises of Amrabati Park and traverses the beautiful lake and greenery of the park. Digha is a seaside resort town in Purba Medinipur district and at the northern end of the Bay of Bengal.

 Kolkata Science City ropeway: Built in 1998, with 500 PPH capacity in the heart of city Kolkata.

See also
 Transport in India
 List of aerial tramways
 List of gondola lifts
 Urban rail transit in India

References

Transport in India
 
list